Edward Harington may refer to:
Edward Harington (politician) (c. 1526–c. 1600), English politician
Edward Harington of Ridlington (died 1652), English landowner
Edward Charles Harington (1804–1881), English churchman and writer

See also
Edward Harrington (disambiguation)